The 1964 Grote Prijs van Limborg (Limborgh Grand Prix), was the inaugural race to bear the title. It was a non-championship race for Formula Two cars, held on the Zolder, race track in Heusden-Zolder, Belgium, on 23 August 1964.

Report

Entry
A total of 30 F2 cars were entered for the event. However, only 21 took part in qualifying.

Qualifying

Race
The race was held over two heats, both of 25 laps of the Zolder circuit. The winner was based on the aggregated points scored across the two heats. Points were awarded, based on the drivers finishing positions. Denny Hulme took the overall winner's spoils for the works Brabham team, driving their Brabham-Cosworth BT10. The podium was completed by another Ron Harris Lotus, of Brian Hart, in a Lotus 32, just a further 9.9 seconds behind his team-mate, despite being equal on points.

Heat One saw Jackie Stewart take the win for Ron Harris, with Hulme 4.6seconds adrift and Richard Attwood in third. However, as Stewart and Attwood retired in the second heat, this left Hulme in first place, nearly 17 seconds clear of Alan Rees. Hart was a further 4.9 seconds behind, but this combined with his sixth place in heat one, left him equal on points with Bianchi, who finished fifth and fourth in the heats respectively, but approximately 10 seconds down on the aggregate race times.

Classification

Aggregate race result

Fastest lap: Richard Attwood, 1:40.45secs.

Heat 1 result

Heat 2 result

References

1964 in motorsport
Grote Prijs van Limborg
Formula Two races